Maddalena Buonsignori was a 14th-century law professor at the University of Bologna. 

Buonsignori taught jurisprudence in 1380. Around this time other women were given similar opportunities at Bologna University, however this opportunity was unique to the school.  She wrote a Latin treatise, De Legibus Connubialibus, in which she explored the legal status of the women in her time from various points of view.

References

14th-century Italian lawyers
Academic staff of the University of Bologna
14th-century Italian jurists
14th-century Latin writers
14th-century Italian women writers
Italian women lawyers